Jay Clayton (born July 11, 1951 in Dallas, Texas, as John B. Clayton, IV) is an American literary critic who is known for his pioneering work on the relationship between nineteenth-century culture and postmodernism. He has published influential works on Romanticism and the novel, Neo-Victorian literature, steampunk, hypertext fiction, online games, contemporary American fiction, technology in literature, and genetics in literature and film. He is the William R. Kenan, Jr. Professor of English and Director of the Curb Center for Art, Enterprise, and Public Policy at Vanderbilt University.

Academic career
Clayton attended Highland Park High School in Dallas, Texas and The Hill School, in Pottstown, Pennsylvania, before going on to receive his B.A. from Yale University. He earned his Ph.D. from the University of Virginia in 1979. He taught English at the University of Wisconsin–Madison before moving to Vanderbilt University in 1988. He received a Guggenheim Fellowship in 1999. As Chair of the English department at Vanderbilt from 2003 to 2010, he helped recruit renowned professors to the university.

His first book Romantic Vision and the Novel, published by Cambridge University Press in 1987, compared Victorian realist fiction with romantic poetry. It proposed a theory of Romantic visionary moments in nineteenth-century English fiction as lyric disruptions of the narrative line.

His book on multiculturalism in American fiction and theory, Pleasures of Babel: Contemporary American Literature and Theory, published by Oxford University Press in 1993, was selected by Choice as An Outstanding Academic Book for 1995. Surveying American fiction and literary theory from the 1970s-1990s, Clayton argued for the political and social power of narratives.

His best known book, Charles Dickens in Cyberspace: The Afterlife of the Nineteenth Century in Postmodern Culture, was published by Oxford University Press in 2003. It won the Suzanne M. Glasscock Humanities Book Prize for Interdisciplinary Scholarship in 2004. Moving from Jane Austen and Charles Dickens to William Gibson and Neal Stephenson, Clayton shows how Victorian literature and technology reverberates in contemporary American culture.

Clayton was an early adopter of digital approaches to pedagogy, teaching classes on hypertext and computer games beginning in 1996. In 2013, he launched a highly successful MOOC on the Coursera platform titled “Online Games: Literature, New Media, and Narrative,” which has reached over 85,000 students from more than 120 countries around the world. More recently, his classes have focused on literature, genetics, and science policy.

Publications

Books
 2003, Charles Dickens in Cyberspace: The Afterlife of the Nineteenth Century in Postmodern Culture
 1993, The Pleasures of Babel: Contemporary American Literature and Theory
 1987, Romantic Vision and the Novel

Edited collections
 2007, Genomics in Literature, Visual Arts, and Culture. Co-edited with Priscilla Wald
 2002, Time and the Literary. Co-edited with Marianne Hirsch and Karen Newman
 1991, Influence and Intertextuality in Literary History. Co-edited with Eric Rothstein
 1988, Contemporary Literature and Contemporary Theory. Co-edited with Betsy Draine

Selected articles

 2016, “The Modern Synthesis: Genetics and Dystopia in the Huxley Circle,” Modernism/Modernity
 2013, “The Ridicule of Time: Science Fiction, Bioethics, and the Posthuman,” American Literary History
 2013, “Genome Time: Post-Darwinism, Then and Now,” Critical Quarterly
 2012, “Touching the Telectroscope: Haptic Communications,” Journal of Victorian Culture
 2012, “The Dickens Tape: Affect and Sound Reproduction in The Chimes,” Essays and Studies
 2012, “The Future of Victorian Literature,” Cambridge History of Victorian Literature 
 2009, “Literature and Science Policy: A New Project for the Humanities,” PMLA
 2007, “Victorian Chimeras, or, What Literature Can Contribute to Genetics Policy Today,” New Literary History 
 2003, “Frankenstein's Futurity,” The Cambridge Companion to Mary Shelley
 2002, “Convergence of the Two Cultures: A Geek’s Guide to Contemporary Literature,” American Literature 
 2002, “Genome Time,” Time and the Literary
 2000, “Hacking the Nineteenth Century,” Victorian Afterlife: Postmodern Culture Rewrites the Nineteenth Century
 1997, “The Voice in the Machine: Hazlitt, Hardy, James,” Language Machines: Technologies of Literary and Cultural Production
 1996, “Concealed Circuits: Frankenstein's Monster, the Medusa, and the Cyborg,” Raritan 
 1995, “Londublin: Dickens's London in Joyce's Dublin,” Novel: A Forum on Fiction 
 1995, “Is Pip Postmodern? or, Dickens at the End of the Twentieth Century,” Case Studies in Contemporary Criticism: Charles Dickens's "Great Expectations”
 1993, “A Portrait of the Romantic Poet as a Young Modernist: Literary History as Textual Unconscious,” Joyce: The Return of the Repressed
 1991, “Dickens and the Genealogy of Postmodernism,” Nineteenth Century Literature
 1991, “The Alphabet of Suffering: Effie Deans, Tess Durbeyfield, Martha Ray, and Hetty Sorrel,” Influence and Intertextuality in Literary History
 1991, “Figures in the Corpus: Theories of Influence and Intertextuality” (with Eric Rothstein), Influence and Intertextuality in Literary History
 “The Narrative Turn in Recent Minority Fiction,” American Literary History 
 1989, “Narrative and Theories of Desire,” Critical Inquiry 
 1979, “Visionary Power and Narrative Form: Wordsworth and Adam Bede,” ELH

Awards
 2016, Distinguished Visiting Fellow, Queen Mary University, London
 2014, Harvie Branscomb Distinguished Professor Award, Vanderbilt University
 2005, Suzanne M. Glasscock Humanities Book Prize for Interdisciplinary Scholarship
 1999, John Simon Guggenheim Fellowship
 1996-99, The English Institute Board of Supervisors
 1997, Spence Lee Wilson and Rebecca Webb Fellow, Robert Penn Warren Center for Humanities
 1995-96, President, Society for the Study of Narrative Literature 
 1988, Robert A. Partlow Award, The Dickens Society
 1986, Distinguished Teaching Award, University of Wisconsin
 1981, American Council of Learned Societies Fellowship

External links
 Vanderbilt English Department page

References

American literary critics
Living people
1951 births
Writers from Dallas
Vanderbilt University faculty
Yale University alumni
University of Virginia alumni
University of Wisconsin–Madison faculty
The Hill School alumni